The International Softball Congress (ISC) is a non-profit association for the promotion and administration of men's and boys fastpitch softball throughout North America with athletes coming from all over the world.

The ISC was formed in 1958 as an amalgamation of the National Softball Congress and the International Softball League.

The ISC World Tournament is an annual tournament held each August to crown the best softball club in North America.

Teams from six regions (US East, US Central, US West, Canada East, Canada West, International) are represented at the World Tournament. The ISC allocates berths by region to qualifying tournaments throughout North America. Teams gain entry by winning one of the allocated berths or by accepting an at-large invitation. The current format has 48 teams taking part in a modified double elimination bracket. The first 16 teams eliminated are relegated to the ISC II Tournament. The ISC II Tournament of Champions originally began play in 2002 as a separate tournament for second-tier teams. The two tournaments were amalgamated for the 2010 tournament in Midland, Michigan.

Historical Results

National Softball Congress 1947 to 1957

International Softball League 1951 to 1957

International Softball Congress 1958 to Present

 The final games of the 1971 tournament were cancelled, due to rain, with three teams remaining. The Long Beach Nitehawks of California were awarded first place with an undefeated record. The two remaining teams were named co-runners-up.

ISC II Tournament of Champions 2002 to Present

See also

 The International Softball Federation was the international governing body for the sport of softball until 2013, when it merged with the International Baseball Federation. The international governing body is now known as the World Baseball Softball Confederation.

References

Softball organizations
Sports organizations established in 1958
Softball competitions